San Diego Wave FC is a National Women's Soccer League expansion team that began play in 2022. The team is based in San Diego, California. The team is owned by Ron Burkle.

The team is the San Diego area's first women's professional soccer team since 2003, when the Women's United Soccer Association folded and forced the San Diego Spirit to disband.

History
In January 2021, Lisa Baird, the commissioner of the National Women's Soccer League (NWSL), announced that an expansion team in Sacramento, led by Ron Burkle and in conjunction with Sacramento Republic FC's expansion bid into Major League Soccer, would join the NWSL in 2022. However, Burkle never confirmed the news publicly before exiting the Sacramento Republic's ownership group. Instead, on June 8, 2021, the NWSL announced San Diego as the location for an expansion team owned by Burkle to begin play in 2022.

Colors and crest 

On December 15, 2021, the team revealed its crest for the 2022 season. Press released said, "The crest, encased in a shield, is a symbol of strength, for the city and team, to proudly stand behind. A powerful wave, cresting in the rich blues of the Pacific Ocean, sits front and center as the iconic mark of Wave FC.  And under the proud banner of the city’s name, are the vivid colors of the horizon, celebrating the beauty, fun, and vibrant culture of the city and its people."

Sponsorship

Stadium
The team began play at Torero Stadium on the campus of the University of San Diego for its inaugural season. It moved to Snapdragon Stadium, located in the Mission Valley campus expansion of San Diego State University, for its last two home games of the 2022 season. Wave FC's opener at the new stadium against regional rival and fellow 2022 NWSL entry Angel City FC on September 17 drew a sellout crowd of 32,000, setting a new NWSL single-game attendance record.

Players and staff

Current squad

Coaching staff

Records

Year-by-year

Head coaching record

Only competitive matches are counted. Includes NWSL regular season, playoffs, and Challenge Cup matches.

References

External links
 

2021 establishments in California
Association football clubs established in 2021
National Women's Soccer League teams
Women's soccer clubs in the United States
Women's sports in California
San Diego Wave FC